Charakas is a village in the municipal unit of Asterousia on Crete, Greece with about 1000 inhabitants. It is about 45 km south from Heraklion, which is the largest city of Crete.  The village lies on the foothills of Asterousia mountain and near (15 km) the south coast of Crete, behind the mountain Libyan Sea.  

Charakas has a great rock (haraki), 35m high, with a temple and a castle. Also in the front of Haraki is the Heroon, a monument of warriors and a church of St Panteleymon with a great campanile.

History 

During the period of Venice domination the name of village was San Giovanni, but renamed in Harakas, because there is a great rock in the west side, 35 meters high and about 60m in the width with the name (haraki).On the rock is built a castle and a church The rock is accessed only from the east and it is a monolithic barrow.

Municipality Department Charakas 
This department(Δ.Δ. Χάρακα) is completed from the small villages :
Agia Fotia (Αγιά Φωτιά) [18]),at elevation 275 m to the West(2 km from Harakas), 
Doraki (Δωράκι) [30] to the East(1.5 km), at elevation 310μ.

External links 
  Villages of Municipality Asterousion
  Harakas Asterousion
 cultural club Harakas

Populated places in Heraklion (regional unit)